Juaari is a 1994 Bollywood film starring Armaan Kohli, Dharmendra and Shilpa Shirodkar. The film was released on 7 July 1994. The film didn't do well at the box office and was declared as flop.

Plot
Police Inspector Dharam Singh (Dharmendra) gets involved in a suicide case which involves about gambling of Bombay club which runs by Sanga aka Mr. Sangram. When Dharam Singh tries to arrest Bombay club employees, they get killed by Sanga & Dharam Singh gets blamed for murdering Bombay club employees for which Dharam Singh gets suspended from Police Force. Neeta's Father losses her to Sanga in gambling for which Neeta's Lover Vijay (Armaan Kohli) goes to Sanga & asks to free Neeta. Sanga tells Vijay that he will free her if Vijay arranges 10 lakhs rupees within 3 months if he wants Neeta at any cost. Vijay tries his luck by getting job but instead, he gets beaten by hooligans. Later, Vijay tries his Luck through Salim (Johnny Lever) through Street Gambling & manages to earn money to get Neeta back but instead, Vijay gets jailed. After a while, when Vijay comes out from prison, he gets informed by Salim that Sanga has enslaved Neeta at her Den. To get her back at any cost, Vijay & Salim go to Sanga's club for gambling but in a fight, Sanga's son Vicky gets killed accidentally for which Vijay goes on the run from Sanga. When Sanga hears this, he causes chaos in the city which makes city police have no other choice but to recruit suspended Police Office Dharam Singh to stop Sanga & his chaos. On his way to stop Sanga, Dharam Singh joins forces with Vijay & they save Neeta from Sanga & his Henchmens by killing Sanga & his den.

Cast
Dharmendra...Dharam Singh aka Inspector Hathoda Singh
Armaan Kohli...Vijay
Shilpa Shirodkar...Neeta
Paresh Rawal...Inspector Godbole
Raza Murad...Inspector Waghmare
Kiran Kumar...Sangram Singh (Sanga)
Mehmood...Neeta's Father
Johnny Lever...Salim Tension 
Vikas Anand...Minister
K. K. Raj...Henchman of Sanga
Kailash Nath...Kailash Punjabi

Soundtrack
All songs are written by Anwar Sagar.

References

External links
 

1994 films
1990s Hindi-language films
Films scored by Bappi Lahiri